KCRZ is located in the Visalia, California, area and broadcasts at 104.9 FM with a CHR format. The station, which debut on the air in 1996 and licensed to Tipton, California, is owned by Momentum Broadcasting. As of May 2013 the station began expanding its coverage to the Fresno area that included a rebranding from "Z104.9" to "Hitz 104.9" and adding syndicated programs to its lineup.

Previous logo
 (KCRZ's logo under previous "Z104.9" branding)

References

External links
KCRZ Website

CRZ
Contemporary hit radio stations in the United States